Ludmila Jeske-Choińska-Mikorska (1849 – 2 November 1898) was a Polish singer and composer. She was born in Małachowo, near Poznań, and studied singing in Vienna with Mathilde Marchesi and in Milan with Francesco Lamperti and composition in Warsaw with Gustaw Roguski and Zygmunt Noskowski. Her symphonic poem Rusalka won an award in Chicago in 1893. She married Teodore Jeske-Choiński and died in Warsaw.

Works
Mikorska wrote for orchestra and theater, and also dances and works for piano. Selected works include:
Rusalka symphonic poem
Markiz de Créqui, comic opera, 1892
Filutka, operetta, 1884
Zuch dziewczyna, operetta, 1884

References

External links 
 Scores by Ludmila Jeske-Choińska-Mikorska in digital library Polona

1849 births
1898 deaths
19th-century classical composers
Polish opera composers
Polish composers
Polish Romantic composers
Women classical composers
Women opera composers
19th-century women composers
Polish women composers